The 11203 / 11204 Jaipur–Nagpur Weekly Express is an Express train which runs between  railway station of Nagpur in Maharashtra and  of Rajasthan. It is currently being operated with 11203/11204 train numbers on a daily basis.

Service

The 11203/Nagpur–Jaipur Weekly Express has an average speed of 51 km/hr and covers 1346 km in 26 hrs 10 mins. 11204/Jaipur–Nagpur Weekly Express has an average speed of 50 km/hr and 1346 km in 26 hrs 45 mins.

Route & Halts 

The important halts of the train are:

Coach composite 

The train has standard ICF rakes with max speed of 110 kmph. The train consists of 20 coaches:

 1 AC II Tier
 1 AC III Tier
 12 Sleeper coaches
 4 General
 2 Second-class Luggage/parcel van
Now this train runs with modern LHB coach from 28 feb. 2019.

Traction

Both trains are hauled by a Bhusaval Loco Shed-based WAP-4 locomotive from Nagpur to Kota and from Kota it is hauled by a Bhagat Ki Kothi Loco Shed-based WDP-4D or Ratlam Loco Shed-based WDM-3A of diesel locomotive up til Jaipur and vice versa.

Direction reversal

Train reverses its direction 2 times:

Rake sharing
The train shares its rake with 22137/22138 Prerana Express.

Notes

References

External links 

 11203/Nagpur–Jaipur Weekly Express India Rail Info
 11204/Jaipur–Nagpur Weekly Express India Rail Info

Transport in Nagpur
Express trains in India
Rail transport in Madhya Pradesh
Transport in Jaipur
Rail transport in Rajasthan
Rail transport in Maharashtra
Railway services introduced in 2013